Kuttankulangara Sri Krishna Temple located in Punkunnam, Thrissur district of Kerala, south India and is considered to be over a 300 years old. It is located in the Kuttankulangara ward of Thrissur Municipal Corporation. This temple is a classic example of the Kerala style of architecture. It is 500 m away from Punkunnam Railway station. It is believed that the god gives the fortune of progeny(സന്താനം). There is an interesting ritual called Pannivetta(പന്നി വേട്ട);  model of pig is made and a hunter arrows it down at the base of the Banyan Tree (ആല്‍ത്തറ).

Satellite image
Satellite image of the temple

Near By Places 
Near to the temple a residential area known as  Hari Nagar  is located. Where the famous Mohiniyattam dancer Kalamandalam Kshemavathi is residing.

See also
Punkunnam Siva Temple
Poonkunnam Seetha Ramaswamy Temple

Krishna temples
Hindu temples in Thrissur district